Didenko  or Dindanko is a village and rural commune in the Cercle of Kita in the Kayes Region of south-western Mali. The commune contains 7 villages and in the 2009 census has a population of 9,840.

References

External links
.

Communes of Kayes Region